Editors are a British indie rock band based in Birmingham, who formed in 2002. Previously known as Pilot, The Pride and Snowfield, the band consists of Tom Smith (lead vocals, rhythm guitar, piano), Russell Leetch (bass guitar and live backing vocals), Ed Lay (drums, percussion and live backing vocals), Justin Lockey (lead guitar), and Elliott Williams (keyboards and synthesizers).

Editors have so far released two platinum studio albums, selling over 2 million copies between them worldwide. Their debut album The Back Room was released in 2005. It contained hits such as "Munich" and "Blood" and the following year received a Mercury Prize nomination. Their follow-up album An End Has a Start went to number 1 in the UK Albums Chart in June 2007 and earned the band a Brit Awards nomination for best British Band. It also spawned another Top 10 hit single with the release of "Smokers Outside the Hospital Doors".

Their third studio album, In This Light and On This Evening, was released in October 2009 and debuted at number one on the UK Albums Chart.

Albums

Studio albums

Compilation albums

Box sets

EPs
Snowfield Demo EP (2003), (self-release as Snowfield)

Singles

Notes

Other appearances

Music videos

References

External links
Official site

Discographies of British artists
Rock music group discographies